The Short S.8/8 Rangoon was a 1930s British three-engined biplane flying boat, designed and built by Short Brothers for the Royal Air Force.

Background
In 1929, the Royal Air Force needed urgent replacements of the Supermarine Southampton IIs then operated by No. 203 Squadron RAF based at Basra, Iraq. The Air Ministry issued Specification S.18/29 to specifically cover the procurement of a military variant of the Short S.8 Calcutta, similar to the S.8/2 Calcutta then being designed in collaboration with Breguet for Aviation Navale (French Naval Aviation). The new RAF version had Shorts designation S.8/8 and RAF designation Rangoon, and three examples were initially ordered.

Design and development
The Rangoon was a straightforward military adaption of the Calcutta. The main structure was assembled from duralumin formers, spars, ribs and stringers; the fuselage was skinned with duralumin, and the flying surfaces were partly skinned and partly fabric-covered. The major changes were the provision of an enclosed cockpit for the pilots, rest bunks, enlarged fuel tanks in the upper wing, three Lewis guns (one mounted forward of the cockpit, and two in the fuselage behind the wings), underwing bomb racks, and a large fresh water tank (for intended use in tropical conditions).

Operational history

On 24 September 1930, the first Rangoon (S1433) was flown from the River Medway at Rochester by Shorts' Chief Test Pilot, John Lankester Parker. In early 1931, the first three Rangoons were delivered to the RAF for training at Felixstowe, then in April 1931 they were flown in formation to No. 203 Squadron RAF at Basra. They were used for surveying and anti-smuggling patrols over Iraq and the Persian Gulf. Over the following three years, three more Rangoons (built to a higher specification R.19/31) were delivered to No. 203 Squadron at Basra, where they served without problem until 1935, when they were replaced by Short Singapore IIIs.

In September and October 1934, three Rangoons of No. 203 Squadron visited Australia as part of the celebrations of the centenary of the state of Victoria and of the centenary of Melbourne.

In August 1935, five Rangoons were transferred to No. 210 Squadron RAF at Pembroke Dock. In September 1935, they were temporarily deployed to Gibraltar during the Abyssinia Crisis, and all were retired from service at the end of 1935. Meanwhile, the first Rangoon (S1433) was stripped of military equipment by Shorts at Rochester, registered G-AEIM, then used by Air Pilots Training Ltd for training crews of Imperial Airways at Hamble, until it was retired in late 1938.

Operators

Royal Air Force
No. 203 Squadron RAF
No. 210 Squadron RAF
Air Pilots Training Ltd

Dai-Nippon Teikoku Kaigun Koukuu-tai (Kawanishi H3K variant)

Specifications (S.8/8 Rangoon)

See also

Notes

Bibliography

External links

 Sea-Plane Launching Apparatus: Film of a Short S.8/8 Rangoon demonstrated to the press at RAF Felixstowe.

1930s British patrol aircraft
Flying boats
Rangoon
Trimotors
Biplanes
Aircraft first flown in 1930